The Froehde reagent is used as a simple spot-test to presumptively identify alkaloids, especially opioids, as well as other compounds. It is composed of a mixture of molybdic acid or a molybdate salt dissolved in hot, concentrated sulfuric acid, which is then dripped onto the substance being tested.

The United States Department of Justice method for producing the reagent is the addition of 100 ml of hot, concentrated (95–98%) sulfuric acid to 0.5 g of sodium molybdate or molybdic acid.

The Virginia Department of Forensic Science method uses 0.5 g ammonium molybdate per 100 ml H2SO4 (conc.)

Unheated sulfuric acid can be used to prepare the reagent in a less dangerous manner, but 2–4 hours must be allowed for the molybdate to dissolve.

See also
Reagent testing
Drug checking
Dille–Koppanyi reagent
Folin's reagent
Liebermann reagent
Mandelin reagent
Marquis reagent
Mecke reagent
Simon's reagent
Zwikker reagent

References

Chemical tests
Analytical reagents
Drug testing reagents